Siân Gibson (née Foulkes; born 30 July 1976) is a Welsh comedy actress and television writer. She has collaborated with Peter Kay, including starring in and co-writing the comedy series Peter Kay's Car Share, for which she won the 2016 BAFTA TV Award for Best Scripted Comedy and the National Television Award for Best Comedy.

Gibson has also appeared as Gemma in the Gold original film series Murder on the Blackpool Express which was followed by, Death on the Tyne, Dial M for Middlesbrough and the three-part series Murder They Hope (2017–2022).

Early life
Gibson was born and raised in Mold, Wales. Her father was a builder and her mother a housewife. She joined the local youth theatre in Theatr Clwyd. She studied performing arts at Salford University where she met fellow students Peter Kay and Steve Edge. Gibson also performed stand-up comedy early in her career. Her subjects of choice include impressions. Her comic influences include Victoria Wood, Julie Walters, French and Saunders.

Career
Gibson's credits include Peak Practice, Hospital People, Emmerdale and The League of Gentlemen.
From 1998 until 1999 she appeared in Hollyoaks playing Tessie Thompson and returned in October/November 2007 in four further episodes. She also appeared in two episodes of Phoenix Nights as the daughter of one of the main characters, Mary. Gibson's character also goes by the name Mary, though several characters refer to her as "Young Mary", Paddy (Paddy McGuinness) – who works with Max (Peter Kay) as security on the door at the Phoenix Club – takes a shine to her and can be seen chatting her up as she works alongside her mother behind the bar at the titular working men's club.

In 2006, Gibson, along with Peter Kay, appeared in the music video to the Texas song "Sleep".

In 2008, Gibson appeared in Peter Kay's music video for the Geraldine  McQueen song "Once Upon a Christmas Song" as her Britain's Got the Pop Factor... and Possibly a New Celebrity Jesus Christ Soapstar Superstar Strictly on Ice character Wendy.

Before landing a role in Peter Kay's Car Share in 2015, Gibson had not auditioned for any acting roles for over a year and was working in a call centre in Chester. Kay had received the script from Paul Coleman and Tim Reid, who sought his opinion. Although Kay loved the script he initially had no intention of appearing in the series. He later asked Gibson if she wanted to work with him and they set to work rewriting the script to fit themselves, since John and Kayleigh as originally scripted were meant to be slightly younger. The success of the series brought Gibson to wider prominence and opened the door for other roles. She returned for the second series of Car Share in April 2017.

In January 2018, she appeared in Inside No. 9 and  an episode of Death in Paradise.

In 2019, Gibson participated in the eighth series of Taskmaster.

Personal life
Gibson is married to Ian Gibson, a gas fitter. They have a daughter, Gracie, who was born in 2013.

Filmography

TV

References

External links

Peter Kay's Car Share, bbc.co.uk; accessed 18 January 2016.
Interview, independent.co.uk; accessed 18 January 2016.

Living people
20th-century Welsh actresses
21st-century Welsh actresses
21st-century Welsh comedians
21st-century Welsh women singers
21st-century Welsh writers
21st-century Welsh women writers
Welsh television actresses
Welsh soap opera actresses
Welsh film actresses
Comedians from Manchester
People from Mold, Flintshire
Place of birth missing (living people)
Alumni of the University of Salford
Welsh television writers
British women television writers
Welsh women comedians
1976 births